Irish people in mainland Europe are members of the Irish diaspora who reside in mainland Europe.

Demographics
While the Irish population in Continental Europe is about 450,000-550,000, it was estimated that there are 2.8 million first, second, and third-generation Irish living there. There are an estimated 5 million people with active interests in Irish music, Irish sports, Irish dancing, Irish culture and Irish literature. For example, Poland's Irish Embassy has confirmed that while there are approximately 500 Irish residents in the country, there are between 50,000 and 100,000 people involved in the Irish music, dancing and cultural scene. Italy, with an estimated Irish population of 2,000 to 5,000, has a website receiving 100,000 regular visitors, mostly covering Irish music and culture in Italy. Similar levels of interest in Irish culture exist all over Europe. To give just a couple of examples, a new Irish center opened in August 2014 in Istanbul, Turkey, more than 650 Irish pubs are located in Germany, and the St. Patrick Day's festival is held annually on March 17 in Stockholm, Sweden.

Communities 
It is difficult to put an exact figure on the Irish citizenship based across Continental Europe. Some countries have a requirement to be registered with the local Irish Embassy, but most European governments have no such requirement . So while the Irish Embassy in Madrid gave an official figure of 15,000 Irish in Spain in 2002, by 2007 there was, albeit unofficially, a more realistic figure of 30,000. Irish people make 1.6 million trips each year to Spain.

Northern Europe 

15,000 Irish live in Denmark, Estonia, Finland, Iceland, Latvia, Lithuania, Norway, and Sweden, where more than 500,000 people regularly attend Irish music, cultural and sports events . These countries host the Nordic Feis annually, with Irish dancing schools from across the region and Irish festivals. Irish societies and associations in Northern Europe actively arrange Irish literature, theatre, sport, music and dancing events across Scandinavia. The region hosts Irish studies centers in Sweden and Denmark. Many of the more than 230 Irish Pubs have regular live Irish music, as well as live Irish sports coverage - GAA, Soccer and Rugby. Norway has an Irish association football club, Finland has a hurling club; Sweden and Denmark played each other in Gaelic football and in hurling in the summer of 2014. Latvia hosts live GAA coverage.

Southern Europe

Southwestern Europe 

30,000 Irish live in mainland Spain, another 15,000 Irish reside in Portugal, Andorra and Gibraltar and on the Balearic and Canary Islands. More than 750,000 people regularly attend Irish music, cultural and sports events in Iberia. There are Irish societies and associations, and you can take Irish culture courses in Spain and Portugal. There is an Irish Dominican parish in Portugal. Many of the 165+ Irish pubs in Spain and Portugal have regular live Irish music, as well as live Irish sports coverage, including GAA, association football and rugby. There are Spanish and Portuguese Irish music groups, Irish dancing schools and groups, and Irish music festivals. There is an Irish darts league in Madrid, and there are GAA clubs for Gaelic football in Barcelona, Madrid, Marbella, Valencia, Seville, Gibraltar and 11 clubs in Galicia. There is an Irish supporters club in Gibraltar.

South-central Europe 

15,000 Irish live in Austria, Italy, Liechtenstein, Malta, Monaco, San Marino, Slovenia, Switzerland, and Vatican City in south-central Europe. Almost a million people regularly in south-central Europe attend Irish music, cultural and sports evenings. Its 300 or so Irish pubs feature regular live Irish music, quiz nights and many feature Irish sports. Irish clubs, societies and associations arrange activities for the integrated Irish communities, and there is a strong Irish cultural and literature following in the region. There are Irish study courses and centers, and the Mediterranean Center for Irish Studies. There are local Irish music groups, Irish dancing schools and groups, organising special Irish music and dance nights and Irish music festivals. Irish nationals play in the region with local soccer, darts, rugby and GAA clubs here; often these clubs are set up by those in the local Irish communities.

Western and Central Europe

Central Europe 
Approximately 5,000 Irish live in Albania, Bosnia and Herzegovina, Croatia, Czechia, Hungary, Montenegro, Poland, Serbia, and Slovakia in Central Europe, and this figure is growing annually . In Hungary, Poland, and Czechia, there are more than 150,000 regular visitors to Irish music, Irish dancing, and Irish culture websites based there . The region has more than 100 Irish music bands, Irish dancing schools and Irish festivals. The Irish in Slovakia have a dedicated newspaper published regularly . There are more than 60 Irish pubs in Central Europe; one has an Irish golf society, another one has a rugby club, and others have darts and soccer clubs. The first ever GAA club was inaugurated in the region in 2014. Irish charity groups also have centers and communities based in the region.

Low Countries 
More than 750,000 people attend the Netherlands', Belgium's and Luxembourg's Irish music, cultural and sports events. The region has Irish clubs, societies and associations, Irish theatre groups, Irish studies centers, and James Joyce groups. Its 200+ Irish bars have regular live Irish music, as well as live Irish sports coverage: GAA, soccer, and rugby. Along with Irish dancing schools and groups, the region has many local Irish music bands and festivals. It also has Irish soccer clubs, darts, rugby, badminton, and GAA clubs, as well as Irish golf societies.

France 
30,000 Irish live in France, including more than 15,000 in Paris.

Germany 
Germany is becoming a magnet for Irish people. According to statistics, over 2,800 people moved to Germany from Ireland in 2012, including almost 800 German citizens. As of 2021, about 35,000 Irish live in Germany. Together with Germans interested in Irish culture, some of these emigrants organise Irish cultural events across the country.

Eastern Europe 

6,000 Irish live in Eastern Europe: Armenia, Azerbaijan, Cyprus, Belarus, Bulgaria, Georgia, Greece, Kazakhstan, Moldova, North Macedonia, Romania, Russia, Turkey, and Ukraine. Irish culture, Music and Dancing is growing in Russia and Nations which were part of the former USSR. There's Irish dancing in Cyprus, Ukraine, Russia, Turkey, Greece, and Bulgaria. Many of the more than 125 Irish bars have regular live Irish music, as well as live Irish sports coverage - GAA, soccer, and rugby. Irish singers and European-based Irish music groups tour here regularly, as do Irish dance shows. There are Irish societies in Cyprus, Russia, Greece, and Belarus, promoting cultural and social links between the host country and Ireland. Locally based Irish regularly support visiting Irish sports, both men's and women's, such as Irish boxing, Irish golf, motor rally, rowing, association football, walking and athletics, rugby, cycling and show jumping teams, which were all in this region this year. Irish charity groups and defence forces also have centers and commitments based in the region.

References

External links
 http://www.irishineurope.com/
 EuropeanIrish.com - The Irish Music, Sport and Cultural Scene in Continental Europe
 Keeping in Touch Newsweek International